The Ghent Gators are an American football team situated in Ghent. The team was established in 1999 by Craig Bailey, an American living in Belgium, through his local pizza delivery business. Along with 8 other Flemish teams, they are part of the Flemish American Football League (FAFL) conference in the Belgian Football League (BFL). They managed to qualify for the playoffs for the first time in their existence on May 18, 2014 and won their first Belgian championship on 29 June 2014 by beating the Brussels Tigers in Belgian Bowl XXVII.

Current Season 
In 2018, the Gators took part in the Belgian second division. They were relegated after the 2016 despite finishing third in the first division due to a forfait in the final game of the season. After cruising through the second division with a record of 8-0 against Izegem Tribes, Leuven Lions and Waasland Wolves, they qualified for the FAFL Bowl. The game was played on 10 June 2018 against the 2nd best team in the division, the Izegem Tribes. After regulation, the score was 28-28 so it went into overtime. On the very first play of overtime, the Tribes managed to score a touchdown and the Gators were unable to respond. This means Izegem won the Flemish title and advanced to the promotion game where they lost to the Ostend Pirates.

Senior Roster

Performance

2000-2004
 - clinched seed to the playoffs

2000 Playoffs

2006-2009

2010 season

2011 season

2012 season

2013 season

2014 season 

After their sixth win of the season - versus the Puurs Titans - the Ghent Gators qualified for the playoffs for the first time since being established in 1999. They finished the season as the first seed in the Flemish American Football League and by doing so, won the Flemish championship and earned a first round bye for the playoffs. In the playoffs they beat the Ostend Pirates - they only team that had beaten them so far this season - in a Semi Final thriller and qualified for Belgian Bowl XXVII. In their first ever Belgian Bowl, the Gators defeated the Brussels Tigers (Walloon Champions) 38-0 and became Belgian Champions.

2015 season

2017 season 

Source:

2018 season

References

External links
 Website Ghent Gators

1999 establishments in Belgium
American football teams in Belgium
Sport in Ghent
American football teams established in 1999
Sports teams in Belgium